The Harvard Crimson represented Harvard University in ECAC women's ice hockey during the 2016–17 NCAA Division I women's ice hockey season.

Offseason
June 18: Sydney Daniels was drafted by the New York Riveters in the NWHL draft.

Recruiting

Roster

2016-17 Crimson

Schedule

|-
!colspan=12 style="  style="background:#af1e2d; color:#fff;"| Regular Season

References

Harvard